Dan Josefson (March 8, 1974) is an American writer. His accomplishments include a 2015 Whiting Award in fiction.

Life
Dan Josefson was born on March 8, 1974, in Mount Kisco, New York. A few months later, Dan moved to Chappaqua, New York. He graduated from Williams College, and from University of Nevada, Las Vegas. He currently lives in Manhattan.

In the Fall of 2012, his book, That's Not a Feeling was released by Soho Press. On November 18, 2012, he appeared in the New York Times Book Review.

Works

References

External links
Official website
http://tetheredbyletters.com/fibs-and-wiggles-an-interview-with-dan-josefson/#!
http://www.theparisreview.org/whiting-josefson

Living people
Williams College alumni
Year of birth missing (living people)